

Heinz Harmel (29 June 1906 – 2 September 2000) was a German SS commander during the Nazi era. He commanded the 10th SS Panzer Division Frundsberg during World War II. Harmel was a recipient of the Knight's Cross of the Iron Cross with Oak Leaves and Swords of Nazi Germany.

Biography
Born in 1906, Harmel volunteered for the SS-Verfügungstruppe (later known as the Waffen-SS) in 1935 and served as a company commander in the SS-Regiment Der Führer, with which he took part in the Battle of France in 1940. In 1941, Harmel took part in the Balkans Campaign and Operation Barbarossa. In December 1941, Harmel took command of SS-Infanterie-Regiment "Deutschland". Harmel participated in the capture of Kharkov on 15 March 1943. Harmel received the Knight's Cross of the Iron Cross on 31 March 1943. On 7 September 1943, he received the Knight's Cross of the Iron Cross with Oak Leaves. In early 1944 after completing a divisional commanders' training course, Harmel took command of the SS Division Frundsberg.

During the summer 1944, the division moved to the Western Front, in Normandy. Harmel had been ordered to break the enemy's lines, to free the German units encircled in Falaise Pocket numbering approximately 125,000 troops of the 7th Army. The operation ended with heavy losses and serious damage. Harmel was then sent to the Netherlands. He fought against the Allied offensive (Operation Market Garden). After the battles around Nijmegen, Harmel received the Knight's Cross of the Iron Cross with Oak Leaves and Swords on 15 December 1944. His division was then transferred to Alsace, where Harmel was ordered to establish a bridgehead to join the Colmar Pocket. After the failure of the December 1944/January 1945 offensive in Alsace, Harmel's division was transferred to the Eastern Front, initially fighting in Pomerania and Brandenburg to hold the Oder Front. The division was subsequently transferred to Heeresgruppe Mitte where in late April it was ordered to counterattack the forces of Marshal Ivan Konev. Harmel refused and was dismissed from command by Field Marshal Schörner. Harmel subsequently commanded an ad hoc battle group formed around the 24th Waffen Mountain Division of the SS, the SS Officer's School at Graz and other smaller units. Harmel surrendered to the Allied forces in Austria and ended up in British captivity. Harmel died in 2000.

Awards
 Iron Cross (1939) 2nd Class (30 May 1940) & 1st Class (1 June 1940)
 German Cross in Gold (29 November 1941)
 Knight's Cross of the Iron Cross with Oak Leaves and Swords
 Knight's Cross on 31 March 1943 as SS-Obersturmbannführer and commander of SS-Panzergrenadier-Regiment "Deutschland".
 296th Oak Leaves on 7 September 1943 as SS-Standartenführer and commander of SS-Panzergrenadier-Regiment "Deutschland"
 116th Swords on 15 November 1944 as SS-Brigadeführer and Generalmajor der Waffen SS and commander of 10. SS-Panzer-Division "Frundsberg"

See also
List SS-Brigadeführer

References

Sources
 A Bridge Too Far, by Cornelius Ryan (Simon&Schuster, 1974) , The Battle of Arnhem in detail, inclusive of the roles of the Waffen-SS Divisions Hohenstaufen and Frundsberg. Based on Cornelius Ryan's extensive interviews of Waffen-SS Generals Willi Bittrich, Heinz Harmel and Walter Harzer (Chapter 3 and 4), the commanding officers on the German side during the battle of Arnhem.
 German Commanders of World War II (2): Waffen-SS, Luftwaffe & Navy (Elite) (v. 2), by Gordon Williamson (Osprey Publishing, 2006) .
 
 

1906 births
2000 deaths
SS-Brigadeführer
Military personnel from Metz
People from Alsace-Lorraine
Recipients of the Gold German Cross
Recipients of the Knight's Cross of the Iron Cross with Oak Leaves and Swords
Reichswehr personnel
Waffen-SS personnel